Robinson College is a constituent college of the University of Cambridge. Founded in 1977, it is one of the newest Oxbridge colleges and is unique in having been intended, from its inception, for both undergraduate and graduate students of both sexes.

The College was founded through a significant donation from the businessman and philanthropist, Sir David Robinson. In 1981 Robinson College was formally opened by Queen Elizabeth II with both undergraduate and graduate students in attendance.

History 

The College was founded after David Robinson offered the University £17 million to establish a new college in Cambridge. Robinson later gave his College another £1 million on the occasion of its official opening. The first graduate students and fellows joined the College in 1977. Undergraduates (20 of them) were first admitted in 1979, but significant numbers only began arriving the following year. Robinson was formally opened by Queen Elizabeth II in May 1981.

Whilst Robinson embraces many Cambridge traditions, such as Formal Hall, a chapel and porters' lodge, it avoids others: for example, it allows its students to walk on the grass in the College gardens. In general, the College has a reputation for being slightly less formal and traditional than other Cambridge Colleges.

Buildings and grounds
Designed by the Scottish architectural firm Gillespie, Kidd & Coia, Robinson's main buildings are distinctive for the use of handmade red bricks in their construction. In November 2022, Historic England announced that the College had been awarded Grade II* listed status. In November 2008, the college was included in the "50 most inspiring buildings in Britain" by The Daily Telegraph. Of particular note is the chapel, which contains stained-glass windows designed by John Piper and houses a renowned Frobenius organ. The oak-panelled dining hall seats 300 for formal dining and the library is remarkable for its use of woodwork, for which it was awarded the Carpenter’s Award for 1981.

The College is located a ten-minute walk west of the city centre, behind the University Library, near the science buildings in West Cambridge and the arts faculties on the university's Sidgwick Site. It stands on a  wooded site of historical and horticultural interest. The College Gardens are a fusion of ten pre-existing gardens which date back to late Victorian and early Edwardian times and are crossed by the Bin Brook stream, which once supplied water to the Medieval Hospital of St John (now St John's College).

Within its grounds are Thorneycreek House and Cottage (built in 1895), the Crausaz Wordsworth Building and the Maria Björnson outdoor theatre. Robinson owns a number of houses on Adams Road and Sylvester Road adjoining the main college site, which it uses for student accommodation.

The main entrance to the college is via a drawbridge-like ramp which is accessible to wheelchair users, and there are also some special facilities for those with physical or visual disabilities.

The Needham Research Institute is also located within the College grounds.

Conferences
As one of Cambridge's most important conference centres, Robinson hosts conferences when undergraduate students are absent.

Student life
Students of the college are represented by the Robinson College Students' Association, or RCSA, headed by a President, with members of the college elected to the RCSA committee every year. Politically, Robinson is generally seen as liberal. Robinson has supplied a large number of Green Officers to the Cambridge University Students' Union in recent years and in 2008 was judged the most environmentally friendly college in Cambridge.

Like other colleges, Robinson provides its students with recreational facilities such as a JCR, MCR, TV room, art room, café and bar. As a result of its other role as a conference centre, the college is equipped with two auditoria that are available for student use during term; the smaller one being frequently used by the college's film society and the larger by the "Brickhouse Theatre Company" (dramatic society). There is also a purpose-built party room that hosts college "bops" and other entertainment. Musical talents are catered for by a music room, CD library and chapel.

There are also several sports teams, covering most major sports: everything from water polo and cricket to rowing and rugby union. Robinson has become successful in hockey, winning the Cambridge colleges league and colleges Varsity match against Oriel College, Oxford, in 2009–2010, in addition to becoming mixed cuppers champions by beating Churchill College, Cambridge.

College arms
The arms of the College are described as follows: 'Azure in base two Bars wavy Argent over all a Pegasus rampant Or gorged with a Crown rayonny Gules.'

College grace
The Latin grace is read before the start of formal hall.

Lord, bless us and your gifts, through Jesus Christ our Lord. Amen.

Gallery

Notable people

Alumni 

Joe Ansbro, Scottish international rugby union player
Morwenna Banks, actress
Joey Batey, actor 
Matt Brittin, Vice-president at Google
Nick Clegg, former Deputy Prime Minister of the United Kingdom and former Leader of the Liberal Democrats
Adrian Davies, Welsh international rugby union player
Mauro Galetti, Brazilian ecologist
Malcolm Gaskill, historian 
Greg Hands, politician, former Chief Secretary to the Treasury
Charles Hart, songwriter and musician
Marko Attila Hoare, historian
Konnie Huq, television presenter
Rebecca John, television presenter and journalist
Tim Lenton, climate scientist
Anthony Lowe, chief executive officer at Prostate Cancer Foundation of Australia
Tim Luckhurst, journalist and former editor of The Scotsman
Sarah MacDonald, former Organ Scholar and first female Director of Music in an Oxbridge College (Selwyn College)
Toby Marlow, co-writer of the West End musical Six, about Henry VIII's wives.
Saul Metzstein, film director, and son of Robinson College architect Isi Metzstein
Neil Mullarkey, comedian, writer
Marie Phillips, author
Kate Pickett, epidemiologist
John Pritchard, Olympic and World rowing medallist
Marc Quinn, artist
Anita Sethi, journalist and writer
Justine Thornton, barrister and wife of the former Leader of the Opposition Ed Miliband
Sam Wallace, journalist
Robert Webb, comedian, writer
Andy White, musician and poet

Fellows 

 G. E. Berrios, neuropsychiatry and epistemology of psychiatry
 Myles Burnyeat, ancient philosopher (honorary fellow)
 Dame Athene Donald, Deputy Head of the Cavendish Laboratory 
 Albrecht Fröhlich FRS, mathematician
 Morna Hooker, Emerita Lady Margaret's Professor of Divinity and first female holder of the Cambridge DD
 Peter Kornicki FBA, East Asian Studies
 Alan Mycroft, computer scientist, co-author of the ARM chip's Norcroft C compiler and trustee of the Raspberry Pi Foundation
 Julie Smith, Baroness Smith of Newnham, Politics and International Studies, member of the House of Lords
 Jeremy Thurlow, composer
 Martin Dixon, law

In addition, the writer Valerie Grosvenor Myer, although not formally a Fellow, supervised English students at Robinson in the 1980s.

List of Wardens

Jack Lewis, Baron Lewis of Newnham (1977 to 2001)
David Yates (2001 to 2021)
Richard Heaton (from 1 October 2021)

See also
 List of organ scholars

References

External links

Robinson College official website
Robinson College Students' Association
Robinson College MCR (Graduate Society)

 
Colleges of the University of Cambridge
Educational institutions established in 1977
1977 establishments in England
Grade II* listed buildings in Cambridge